These are the official results of the Men's 50 km walk event at the 2002 European Championships in Munich, Germany, held on August 8, 2002. Poland's Robert Korzeniowski set a new world record, clocking a total time of 3:36:39, defeating Valeriy Spitsyn's 3:37:26 from May 21, 2000 set in Moscow, Russia.

Medalists

Abbreviations
All times shown are in hours:minutes:seconds

Records

Intermediates

Final

See also
 2002 Race Walking Year Ranking

References
 Results
 Official Results
 IAAF Year Ranking

Walk 50 km
Racewalking at the European Athletics Championships